Touraine is one of the traditional provinces of France. Its capital was Tours. During the political reorganization of French territory in 1790, Touraine was divided between the departments of Indre-et-Loire, :Loir-et-Cher, Indre and Vienne.

Geography
Traversed by the river Loire and its tributaries the Cher, the Indre and the Vienne, Touraine makes up a part of the western Paris Basin. It is well known for its viticulture. The TGV high-speed train system, which connects Tours with Paris (200 kilometers away) in just over an hour, has made Touraine a place of residence for people who work in the French capital but seek a different quality of life.

History
Touraine takes its name from a Celtic tribe called the Turones, who inhabited the region about two thousand years ago.  
In 1044, the control of Touraine was given to the Angevins, who (as the House of Plantagenet) became kings of England in 1154, the castle of Chinon being their greatest stronghold. In 1205, Philip II Augustus of France regained Touraine. At this time, Touraine was made into a royal duchy. In 1429, Saint Joan of Arc had a historic meeting with the future King of France Charles VII at Chinon. Throughout the late 15th and 16th centuries, Touraine was a favorite residence of French kings, and the dark and gloomy castles were converted to Renaissance châteaux; for this reason the region was titled "The Garden of France". These same châteaux became popular tourist attractions in modern times. The royal duchy became a province in 1584, and was divided into departments in 1790.

Sights
Touraine is celebrated for its many châteaux: examples are those at Amboise, Azay-le-Rideau, Chenonceaux, Chinon, Langeais, Loches and Villandry.

Famous natives
 René Descartes
 François Rabelais
 Alfred de Vigny
 Honoré de Balzac
 René Boylesve
 Jean Thurel
 Jakelin de Mailly
 Peter des Roches

Famous non-natives
 Leonardo da Vinci died in Amboise in 1519
 Archibald Douglas, 4th Earl of Douglas, Duke of Touraine leader of the Army of Scotland in France during the Hundred Years' War

Twin towns
 Khouribga, Morocco
 Gafsa, Tunisia

See also
 Centre-Val de Loire
 Touraine AOC

References

 
Former provinces of France
Geography of Indre
Geography of Indre-et-Loire
Geography of Loir-et-Cher
Geography of Vienne
 
History of Centre-Val de Loire
History of Nouvelle-Aquitaine
History of Indre
History of Indre-et-Loire
History of Loir-et-Cher
History of Vienne